A cyclotron is a type of particle accelerator invented by Ernest O. Lawrence in 1929–1930 at the University of California, Berkeley, and patented in 1932. A cyclotron accelerates charged particles outwards from the center of a flat cylindrical vacuum chamber along a spiral path. The particles are held to a spiral trajectory by a static magnetic field and accelerated by a rapidly varying electric field. Lawrence was awarded the 1939 Nobel Prize in Physics for this invention.

The cyclotron was the first "cyclical" accelerator. The primary accelerators before the development of the cyclotron were electrostatic accelerators, such as the Cockcroft–Walton accelerator and Van de Graaff generator.  In these accelerators, particles would cross an accelerating electric field only once.  Thus, the energy gained by the particles was limited by the maximum electrical potential that could be achieved across the accelerating region. This potential was in turn limited by electrostatic breakdown to a few million volts. In a cyclotron, by contrast, the particles encounter the accelerating region many times by following a spiral path, so the output energy can be many times the energy gained in a single accelerating step.

Cyclotrons were the most powerful particle accelerator technology until the 1950s, when they were superseded by the synchrotron. Despite no longer being the highest-energy accelerator, they are still widely used to produce particle beams for nuclear medicine and basic research. As of 2020, close to 1500 cyclotrons were in use worldwide for the production of radionuclides for nuclear medicine. In addition, cyclotrons can be used for particle therapy, where particle beams are directly applied to patients.

History 

In late 1928 and early 1929 Hungarian physicist Leo Szilárd filed patent applications in Germany (later abandoned) for the linear accelerator, cyclotron, and betatron. In these applications, Szilárd became the first person to discuss the resonance condition (what is now called the cyclotron frequency) for a circular accelerating apparatus. Several months later, in the early summer of 1929, Ernest Lawrence independently conceived the cyclotron concept after reading a paper by Rolf Widerøe describing a drift tube accelerator. He published a paper in Science in 1930,
and patented the device in 1932.

To construct the first such device, Lawrence used large electromagnets recycled from obsolete arc converters provided by the Federal Telegraph Company.
He was assisted by a graduate student, M. Stanley Livingston Their first working cyclotron became operational in January 1931.

At the Radiation Laboratory on the campus of the University of California, Berkeley (now the Lawrence Berkeley National Laboratory), Lawrence and his collaborators went on to construct a series of cyclotrons which were the most powerful accelerators in the world at the time; a  4.8 MeV machine (1932), a  8 MeV machine (1937), and a  16 MeV machine (1939). Lawrence received the 1939 Nobel Prize in Physics for the invention and development of the cyclotron and for results obtained with it.

Two cyclotrons were built in Nazi Germany. The first was constructed in 1937, in Otto Hahn's laboratory at the Kaiser Wilhelm Institute in Berlin, and was also used by Rudolf Fleischmann. It was the first cyclotron with a Greinacher multiplier to increase the voltage to 2.8 MV and 3 mA current. A second cyclotron was built in  Heidelberg under the supervision of Walther Bothe and Wolfgang Gentner, with support from the Heereswaffenamt, and became operative in 1943.

By the late 1930s it had become clear that there was a practical limit on the beam energy that could be achieved with the traditional cyclotron design, due to the effects of special relativity.  As particles reach relativistic speeds, their effective mass increases, which causes the resonant frequency for a given magnetic field to change.  To address this issue and reach higher beam energies using cyclotrons, two primary approaches were taken, synchrocyclotrons (which hold the magnetic field constant, but decrease the accelerating frequency) and isochronous cyclotrons (which hold the accelerating frequency constant, but alter the magnetic field).

Lawrence's team built one of the first synchrocyclotrons in 1946. This  machine eventually achieved a maximum beam energy of 350 MeV for protons. However, synchrocyclotrons suffer from low beam intensities (< 1 µA), and must be operated in a "pulsed" mode, further decreasing the available total beam. As such, they were quickly overtaken in popularity by isochronous cyclotrons.

The first isochronous cyclotron (other than classified prototypes) was built by F. Heyn and K.T. Khoe in Delft, the Netherlands, in 1956. Early isochronous cyclotrons were limited to energies of ~50 MeV per nucleon, but as manufacturing and design techniques gradually improved, the construction of "spiral-sector" cyclotrons allowed the acceleration and control of more powerful beams. Later developments included the use of more powerful superconducting magnets and the separation of the magnets into discrete sectors, as opposed to a single large magnet.

Principle of operation

Cyclotron principle 

In a particle accelerator, charged particles are accelerated by applying an electric field across a gap.  The force on a particle crossing this gap is given by the Lorentz force law:

It is not possible to accelerate particles using only a static magnetic field, as the magnetic force always acts perpendicularly to the direction of motion, and therefore can only change the direction of the particle, not the speed.

In practice, the magnitude of an unchanging electric field which can be applied across a gap is limited by the need to avoid electrostatic breakdown. As such, modern particle accelerators use alternating (radio frequency) electric fields for acceleration. Since an alternating field across a gap only provides an acceleration in the forward direction for a portion of its cycle, particles in RF accelerators travel in bunches, rather than a continuous stream. In a linear particle accelerator, in order for a bunch to "see" a forward voltage every time it crosses a gap, the gaps must be placed further and further apart, in order to compensate for the increasing speed of the particle.

A cyclotron, by contrast, uses a magnetic field to bend the particle trajectories into a spiral, thus allowing the same gap to be used many times to accelerate a single bunch.  As the bunch spirals outward, the increasing distance between transits of the gap is exactly balanced by the increase in speed, so a bunch will reach the gap at the same point in the RF cycle every time.

The frequency at which a particle will orbit in a perpendicular magnetic field is known as the cyclotron frequency, and depends, in the non-relativistic case, solely on the charge and mass of the particle, and the strength of the magnetic field:

The property that the frequency is independent of particle velocity is what allows a single, fixed gap to be used to accelerate a particle travelling in a spiral.

Particle energy 

Each time a particle crosses the accelerating gap in a cyclotron, it is given an accelerating force by the electric field across the gap, and the total particle energy gain can be calculated by multiplying the increase per crossing by the number of times the particle crosses the gap.

However, given the typically high number of revolutions, it is usually simpler to estimate the energy by combining the equation for frequency in circular motion:

with the cyclotron frequency equation to yield:

The kinetic energy for particles with speed  is therefore given by:

where  is the radius at which the energy is to be determined. The limit on the beam energy which can be produced by a given cyclotron thus depends on the maximum radius which can be reached by the magnetic field and the accelerating structures, and on the maximum strength of the magnetic field which can be achieved.

K-factor 

In the nonrelativistic approximation, the maximum kinetic energy per atomic mass for a given cyclotron is given by:

The value of K

is known as the "K-factor", and is used to characterize the maximum beam energy of a cyclotron.  It represents the theoretical maximum energy of protons (with Q and A equal to 1) accelerated in a given machine.

Particle trajectory 

While the trajectory followed by a particle in the cyclotron is conventionally referred to as a "spiral", it is more accurately described as a series of arcs of constant radius. The particle speed, and therefore orbital radius, only increases at the accelerating gaps. Away from those regions, the particle will orbit (to a first approximation) at a fixed radius.

Still, a simple spiral may be a useful approximation. Considering that the particle gains energy  in each turn, its energy after  turns will be:
 
Combining it with the equation for the kinetic energy of a particle in the cyclotron gives:
 
This is the equation of a Fermat spiral.

Stability and focusing 

As a particle bunch travels around a cyclotron, two effects tend to make its particles spread out.  The first is simply the particles injected from the ion source having some initial spread of positions and velocities. This spread tends to get amplified over time, making the particles move away from the bunch center.  The second is the mutual repulsion of the beam particles due to their electrostatic charges. Keeping the particles focused for acceleration requires confining the particles to the plane of acceleration (in-plane or "vertical" focusing), preventing them from moving inward or outward from their correct orbit ("horizontal" focusing), and keeping them synchronized with the accelerating RF field cycle (longitudinal focusing).

Transverse stability and focusing 

The in-plane or "vertical" focusing is typically achieved by varying the magnetic field around the orbit, i.e. with azimuth. A cyclotron using this focusing method is thus called an azimuthally-varying field (AVF) cyclotron. The variation in field strength is provided by shaping the steel core of the magnet into sectors.  This solution for focusing the particle beam was proposed by L. H. Thomas in 1938 and almost all modern cyclotrons use azimuthally-varying fields. 

The "horizontal" focusing happens as a natural result of cyclotron motion.  Since for identical particles travelling perpendicularly to a constant magnetic field the trajectory curvature radius is only a function of their speed, all particles with the same speed will travel in circular orbits of the same radius, and a particle with a slightly incorrect trajectory will simply travel in a circle with a slightly offset center.  Relative to a particle with a centered orbit, such a particle will appear to undergo a horizontal oscillation relative to the centered particle. This oscillation is stable for particles with a small deviation from the reference energy.

Longitudinal stability 

The instantaneous level of synchronization between a particle and the RF field is expressed by phase difference between the RF field and the particle. In the first harmonic mode (i.e. particles make one revolution per RF cycle) it is the difference between the instantaneous phase of the RF field and the instantaneous azimuth of the particle. Fastest acceleration is achieved when the phase difference equals 90° (modulo 360°). Poor synchronization, i.e. phase difference far from this value, leads to the particle being accelerated slowly or even decelerated (outside of the 0–180° range).

As the time taken by a particle to complete an orbit depends only on particle's type, magnetic field (which may vary with the radius), and Lorentz factor (see ), cyclotrons have no longitudinal focusing mechanism which would keep the particles synchronized to the RF field. The phase difference, that the particle had at the moment of its injection into the cyclotron, is preserved throughout the acceleration process, but errors from imperfect match between the RF field frequency and the cyclotron frequency at a given radius accumulate on top of it. Failure of the particle to be injected with phase difference within about ±20° from the optimum may make its acceleration too slow and its stay in the cyclotron too long. As a consequence, half-way through the process the phase difference escapes the 0–180° range, the acceleration turns into deceleration, and the particle fails to reach the target energy. Grouping of the particles into correctly synchronized bunches before their injection into the cyclotron thus greatly increases the injection efficiency.

Relativistic considerations 

In the non-relativistic approximation, the cyclotron frequency does not depend upon the particle's speed or the radius of the particle's orbit. As the beam spirals outward, the rotation frequency stays constant, and the beam continues to accelerate as it travels a greater distance in the same time period. In contrast to this approximation, as particles approach the speed of light, the cyclotron frequency decreases due to the change in relativistic mass. This change is proportional to the particle's Lorentz factor.

The relativistic mass can be written as:

where:
  is the particle rest mass,
  is the relative velocity, and
  is the Lorentz factor.

Substituting this into the equations for cyclotron frequency and angular frequency gives:

The gyroradius for a particle moving in a static magnetic field is then given by:

Expressing the speed in this equation in terms of frequency and radius

yields the connection between the magnetic field strength, frequency, and radius:

Approaches to relativistic cyclotrons

Synchrocyclotron 

Since  increases as the particle reaches relativistic velocities, acceleration of relativistic particles requires modification of the cyclotron to ensure the particle crosses the gap at the same point in each RF cycle. If the frequency of the accelerating electric field is varied while the magnetic field is held constant, this leads to the synchrocyclotron. 

In this type of cyclotron, the accelerating frequency is varied as a function of particle orbit radius such that: 

The decrease in accelerating frequency is tuned to match the increase in gamma for a constant magnetic field.

Isochronous cyclotron 

If instead the magnetic field is varied with radius while the frequency of the accelerating field is held constant, this leads to the isochronous cyclotron.

Keeping the frequency constant allows isochronous cyclotrons to operate in a continuous mode, which makes them capable of producing much greater beam current than synchrocyclotrons. On the other hand, as precise matching of the orbital frequency to the accelerating field frequency is the responsibility of the magnetic field variation with radius, the variation must be precisely tuned.

Fixed-field alternating gradient accelerator (FFA) 

An approach which combines static magnetic fields (as in the synchrocyclotron) and alternating gradient focusing (as in a synchrotron) is the fixed-field alternating gradient accelerator (FFA).  In an isochronous cyclotron, the magnetic field is shaped by using precisely machined steel magnet poles.  This variation provides a focusing effect as the particles cross the edges of the poles.  In an FFA, separate magnets with alternating directions are used to focus the beam using the principle of strong focusing.  The field of the focusing and bending magnets in an FFA is not varied over time, so the beam chamber must still be wide enough to accommodate a changing beam radius within the field of the focusing magnets as the beam accelerates.

Classifications

Cyclotron types
There are a number of basic types of cyclotron:

Beam types

The particles for cyclotron beams are produced in ion sources of various types.

Target types

To make use of the cyclotron beam, it must be directed to a target.

Usage

Basic research 

For several decades, cyclotrons were the best source of high-energy beams for nuclear physics experiments.  With the advent of strong focusing synchrotrons, cyclotrons were supplanted as the accelerators capable of producing the highest energies. However, due to their compactness, and therefore lower expense compared to high energy synchrotrons, cyclotrons are still used to create beams for research where the primary consideration is not achieving the maximum possible energy. Cyclotron based nuclear physics experiments are used to measure basic properties of isotopes (particularly short lived radioactive isotopes) including half life, mass, interaction cross sections, and decay schemes.

Medical uses

Radioisotope production 

Cyclotron beams can be used to bombard other atoms to produce short-lived isotopes with a variety of medical uses, including medical imaging and radiotherapy.  Positron and gamma emitting isotopes, such as fluorine-18, carbon-11, and technetium-99m are used for PET and SPECT imaging. While cyclotron produced radioisotopes are widely used for diagnostic purposes, therapeutic uses are still largely in development.  Proposed isotopes include astatine-211, palladium-103, rhenium-186, and bromine-77, among others.

Beam therapy 

The first suggestion that energetic protons could be an effective treatment method was made by Robert R. Wilson in a paper published in 1946 while he was involved in the design of the Harvard Cyclotron Laboratory.

Beams from cyclotrons can be used in particle therapy to treat cancer. Ion beams from cyclotrons can be used, as in proton therapy, to penetrate the body and kill tumors by radiation damage, while minimizing damage to healthy tissue along their path. 

As of 2020, there were approximately 80 facilities worldwide for radiotherapy using beams of protons and heavy ions, consisting of a mixture of cyclotrons and synchrotrons. Cyclotrons are primarily used for proton beams, while synchrotrons are used to produce heavier ions.

Advantages and limitations

The most obvious advantage of a cyclotron over a linear accelerator is that because the same accelerating gap is used many times, it is both more space efficient and more cost efficient; particles can be brought to higher energies in less space, and with less equipment. The compactness of the cyclotron reduces other costs as well, such as foundations, radiation shielding, and the enclosing building. Cyclotrons have a single electrical driver, which saves both equipment and power costs. Furthermore, cyclotrons are able to produce a continuous beam of particles at the target, so the average power passed from a particle beam into a target is relatively high compared to the pulsed beam of a synchrotron.

However, as discussed above, a constant frequency acceleration method is only possible when the accelerated particles are approximately obeying Newton's laws of motion. If the particles become fast enough that relativistic effects become important, the beam becomes out of phase with the oscillating electric field, and cannot receive any additional acceleration. The classical cyclotron (constant field and frequency) is therefore only capable of accelerating particles up to a few percent of the speed of light. Synchro-, isochronous, and other types of cyclotrons can overcome this limitation, with the tradeoff of increased complexity and cost.

An additional limitation of cyclotrons is due to space charge effects – the mutual repulsion of the particles in the beam.  As the amount of particles (beam current) in a cyclotron beam is increased, the effects of electrostatic repulsion grow stronger until they disrupt the orbits of neighboring particles.  This puts a functional limit on the beam intensity, or the number of particles which can be accelerated at one time, as distinct from their energy.

Notable examples

Related technologies
The spiraling of electrons in a cylindrical vacuum chamber within a transverse magnetic field is also employed in the magnetron, a device for producing high frequency radio waves (microwaves). In the magnetron, electrons are bent into a circular path by a magnetic field, and their motion is used to excite resonant cavities, producing electromagnetic radiation.

A betatron uses the change in the magnetic field to accelerate electrons in a circular path. While static magnetic fields cannot provide acceleration, as the force always acts perpendicularly to the direction of particle motion, changing fields can be used to induce an electromotive force in the same manner as in a transformer.  The betatron was developed in 1940, although the idea had been proposed substantially earlier.

A synchrotron is another type of particle accelerator that uses magnets to bend particles into a circular trajectory.  Unlike in a cyclotron, the particle path in a synchrotron has a fixed radius.  Particles in a synchrotron pass accelerating stations at increasing frequency as they get faster.  To compensate for this frequency increase, both the frequency of the applied accelerating electric field and the magnetic field must be increased in tandem, leading to the "synchro" portion of the name.

In fiction
The United States Department of War famously asked for dailies of the Superman comic strip to be pulled in April 1945 for having Superman bombarded with the radiation from a cyclotron.

In the 1984 film Ghostbusters, a miniature cyclotron forms part of the proton pack used for catching ghosts.

See also

 Cyclotron radiation – radiation produced by non-relativistic charged particles bent by a magnetic field
 Fast neutron therapy – a type of beam therapy that may use accelerator produced beams
 Microtron - an accelerator concept similar to the cyclotron which uses a linear accelerator type accelerating structure with a constant magnetic field. 
 Radiation reaction force – a braking force on beams that are bent in a magnetic field

Notes

References

Further reading

 About a neighborhood cyclotron in Anchorage, Alaska.
 An experiment done by Fred M. Niell, III his senior year of high school (1994–95) with which he won the overall grand prize in the ISEF.

External links

Current facilities
 The 88-Inch Cyclotron at Lawrence Berkeley National Laboratory
 PSI Proton Accelerator – the highest beam current cyclotron in the world.
 RIKEN Nishina Center for Accelerator-based Science – Home of the highest energy cyclotron in the world
 Rutgers Cyclotron – Students at Rutgers University built a  1 MeV cyclotron as an undergraduate project, which is now used for a senior-level undergraduate and a graduate lab course.
 TRIUMF – the largest single-magnet cyclotron in the world.

Historic cyclotrons
 Ernest Lawrence's Cyclotron A history of cyclotron development at the Berkeley Radiation Laboratory, now Lawrence Berkeley National Laboratory
 National Superconducting Cyclotron Laboratory of the Michigan State University – Home of coupled K500 and K1200 superconducting cyclotrons; the K500, the first superconducting cyclotron, and the K1200, formerly the most powerful in the world.

1932 introductions
Accelerator physics
American inventions
Nuclear medicine
Particle accelerators